Declan Keilty (born 8 May 1995) is a former professional Australian Rules Footballer who played for the Melbourne Football Club in the Australian Football League (AFL). He was selected at pick #41 in the 2017 rookie draft. He made his senior debut against Hawthorn in round 7 of the 2019 season. After playing 2 senior games, Keilty was delisted by Melbourne at the end of 2019.

Statistics
 Statistics are correct to the end of 2019

|- style="background-color: #EAEAEA"
! scope="row" style="text-align:center" | 2019
|
| 45 || 2 || 0 || 0 || 6 || 9 || 15 || 3 || 8 || 0.0 || 0.0 || 3.0 || 4.5 || 7.5 || 1.5 || 4.0
|- class="sortbottom"
! colspan=3| Career
! 2
! 0
! 0
! 6
! 9
! 15
! 3
! 8
! 0.0
! 0.0
! 3.0
! 4.5
! 7.5
! 1.5
! 4.0
|}

References

External links

Declan Keilty from AFL Tables

Melbourne Football Club players
Casey Demons players
1995 births
Living people
Australian rules footballers from Victoria (Australia)